Mahatma Gandhi University is a private university located in  Ri-Bhoi and Tura in Meghalaya, India.It  was established by the  Meghalaya State legislative Act, 2010.
The Mahatma Gandhi University, informally known as MGU, is a State Private University located in Meghalaya, India. It was founded in 2011  by Meghalaya State legislative Act, 2010 (Meghalaya Act No.6 of 2011). MGU is empowered to award degrees as specified by the University Grants Commission (UGC) under section 22 of the UGC Act 1956.Consisting of two campuses, 23 faculties and almost 1500 students, the University provides 56 courses, distributed across Khanapara and Tura campuses.

References

External links

2011 establishments in Meghalaya
Universities and colleges in Meghalaya
Educational institutions established in 2011
Private universities in India